This is a list of models and meshes commonly used in 3D computer graphics for testing and demonstrating rendering algorithms and visual effects. Their use is important for comparing results, similar to the way standard test images are used in image processing.

Modelled 

Designed using CAD software; sorted by year of modelling.

Scanned 

Includes photogrammetric methods; sorted by year of scanning.

Gallery

Notes

See also 
Standard test image, a digital image file to test image processing and compression
Catmull's hand, one of the original 3D models
Sutherland's Volkswagen, another early 3D model

References

External links 

 Standard test models
 The Stanford 3D Scanning Repository hosted by the Stanford University
 Large Geometric Models Archive hosted by the Georgia Institute of Technology
 Other repositories
 The Utah 3D Animation Repository, a small collection of animated 3D models
 scene collection, by Physically Based Rendering Toolkit: a number of interesting scenes to render with global illumination
 MGF Example Scenes, a small collection of some indoor 3D scenes
 archive3D, a collection of 3D models
 Hum3D, a collection of vehicle 3D models
 3DBar, a collection of free 3D models
 NASA 3D Models, NASA 3D models to use for educational or informational purposes
 VRML Models from ORC Incorporated, 3D models in VRML format
 3dRender.com: Lighting Challenges, regularly held lighting challenges, complete with scene and models for each challenge
 MPI Informatics Building Model, a virtual reconstruction of the Max Planck Institute for Informatics building in Saarbrücken
 Princeton shape-based 3D model search engine
 Keenan's 3D Model Repository hosted by the Carnegie Mellon University
 HeiCuBeDa Hilprecht – Heidelberg Cuneiform Benchmark Dataset for the Hilprecht Collection a collection of almost 2.000 cuneiform tablets for bulk-download acquired with a high-resolution 3D-scanner. Available under a CC BY license and quotable by digital object identifiers. Datasets cleaned using the GigaMesh Software Framework.
 HeiCu3Da Hilprecht – Heidelberg Cuneiform 3D Database - Hilprecht Collection browsable version of HeiCuBeDa allowing to download and quote single 3D models.

3D graphics models
Test items